The 2019 Colorado Rapids season is the club's twenty-fourth season of existence and their twenty-fourth consecutive season in Major League Soccer (MLS), the top flight of American soccer. Colorado will also compete in the U.S. Open Cup. The season covers the period from October 29, 2018 to the start of the 2020 Major League Soccer season.

Background

Colorado finished the 2018 season second-bottom of the Western Conference table, with the third-worst overall record in MLS. The Rapids finished 11th in the Western Conference and 21st in the overall table. The team scored a league-low 36 goals in 34 matches, and conceded 63 goals. Dominique Badji, who was traded to FC Dallas on July 23, led Colorado with seven goals across all competitions.

Outside of MLS play, the Rapids played in the 2018 edition of the U.S. Open Cup, where they lost in the fourth round to Nashville SC. They also played in the 2018 CONCACAF Champions League, where they were eliminated in the Round of 16 by Toronto FC.

Roster

Non-competitive

Preseason

Midseason

Competitive

Major League Soccer

Standings

Western Conference

Overall table

Results summary

Results by round

Match results

U.S. Open Cup

Statistics

Appearances and goals

|-
|colspan=10 align=center|Players who left Colorado during the season:

|}

Disciplinary record

Clean sheets

Transfers

In

SuperDraft

The following players were selected by Colorado in the MLS SuperDraft, but did not sign a contract with the club.

Loan in

Out

Loan out

Awards

Kits

See also
 Colorado Rapids
 2019 in American soccer
 2019 Major League Soccer season

References

Colorado Rapids seasons
Colorado Rapids
Colorado Rapids
Colorado Rapids